Events from the year 1242 in Ireland.

Incumbent
Lord: Henry III

Deaths
Richard Mor de Burgh (born c. 1194)  was the eldest son of William de Burgh and founder of the towns of Ballinasloe, Loughrea and Galway.
Hugh de Lacy, 1st Earl of Ulster

References